The Tala Hamza mine is one of the largest lead and zinc mines in Algeria.  The mine is located in northern Algeria. The mine has reserves amounting to 68.6 million tonnes of ore grading 1.1% lead and 4.6% zinc thus resulting 0.75 million tonnes of lead and 3.15 million tonnes of zinc.

See also 
 List of mines in Algeria

References 

Lead and zinc mines in Algeria